Nkoaranga is an administrative ward in the Meru District  of the Arusha Region of Tanzania. the ward is home to part of the Arusha National Park, Nkoaranga Hospital and the Ngaresero Lodge. According to the 2002 census, the ward has a total population of 13,338.

References

Wards of Meru District
Wards of Arusha Region